Skyscraper is a 1959 documentary film by Shirley Clarke about the construction of the 666 Fifth Avenue skyscraper.

Film
The construction of 666 Fifth Avenue skyscraper is shown. The film is mostly black and white. The film was sponsored by Tishman Realty & Construction Co.; Reynolds Metals Co.; Bethlehem Steel Co.; Westinghouse Elevator Co.; York Air Conditioning.

Production and reception
Sky was a short film, and a documentary. It was considered experimental. As well as Clarke and Van Dyke contributing it also involved Wheaton Galentine and D. A. Pennebaker. Clarke said the film was a musical comedy regarding the skyscrapers construction.

It won the Venice Film Festival award. It was also nominated for an Academy Award in the Best Short Live Action category in 1959. It also won many other festival prizes.

See also
1959 in architecture
Sponsored film

References

External links

Trailer

1959 films
American documentary films
American avant-garde and experimental films
Films directed by Shirley Clarke
Films set in New York City
1950s American films
1959 independent films